Jack is a 1996 American coming-of-age comedy-drama film directed by Francis Ford Coppola and starring Robin Williams. The film co-stars Diane Lane, Jennifer Lopez, Fran Drescher, Bill Cosby, and Brian Kerwin. Williams plays the role of Jack Powell, a boy who ages four times faster than normal as a result of Werner syndrome, a form of progeria.

Plot
The film begins as Karen Powell goes into labor during a costume party and is rushed to the hospital by her husband, Brian, and their friends. Although the delivery is successful, the baby is extremely premature, born after only ten weeks of pregnancy. Strangely, the infant seems to be a normal, healthy, full-term baby. After examinations and tests, the infant, now named Jack, is found to have an exaggerated form of Werner syndrome. Dr. Benfante and Dr. Lin diagnose a very rare autosomal recessive disorder. Their prognosis is that Jack will develop and age at a rate four times as fast as an average child, rendering him "sick as frick" as Dr. Lin explains colloquially.

Jack is next seen ten years later as a ten-year-old boy in the body of a forty-year-old man. Four boys lurk outside his house, swapping rumors of a "monstrosity" of a boy their age who cannot go to school. He scares them away by dipping a fake eye into slime and throwing it at them from his window. He is extremely childish due to his secluded life. He has only socialized with his parents and his tutor, Lawrence Woodruff, who introduces the idea that he should go to public school. His parents initially balk, for fear Jack could be emotionally traumatized.

When he first attends school, he is cast away by several kids since he looks like a 40-year-old man. His dad later gives him some encouragement by installing a basketball hoop to help him learn to fit in. At school the following days, Louis picks him for his team to play basketball with some bullies and they win the game. After school, Louis asks Jack to help him by pretending to be the school principal to help him avoid reprimand from his mom Dolores. Afterwards, they become friends and Louis invites him to a clubhouse with other kids, eventually enlisting him to get adult magazines and other such adult items for his group of friends. Jack attempts to be a normal kid, but when he deals with his first crush, and the heartbreak of confessing it to his teacher, Miss Marquez, he falls down a flight of stairs while attempting to leave, and is rushed to the hospital. His doctor explains that he suffered a shocking severe strain (which could've been a rare form of angina), and that, because of his Werner syndrome, his internal clock is starting to run out. Realizing the dangers it might entail for his health, his parents decide to withdraw him from school, which upsets him.

He sneaks out of the house and goes to a bar, where he gets drunk and befriends a man named Paulie, and tries to hit on Dolores. However, he gets into a fight with a bully and both are arrested. Dolores bails Jack out, and comforts Jack after dropping him off home. Upon returning home, he locks himself in his room and doesn't go out for weeks. Karen speculates that perhaps he realized the fragility of his life and is now scared of facing the outside world again. He also doubts the need to study as he realizes that he wouldn't have the time to use any of the knowledge.

Meanwhile, his friends continue coming to his house, hoping that he will come out and play, but he refuses. Finally, Louis has an idea: he brings the entire class over as they take turns yelling "Can Jack come out and play?" and participate in various games and fun activities right in front of the yard. The next day he decides to go back to school.

Seven years later, an elderly-looking Jack and his four best friends are at their high school graduation. He delivers the valedictorian speech, in which he reminds his classmates that life is short, and urges them to "make your life spectacular," as the five of them drive off into the future.

Cast
 Robin Williams as Jack Powell
 Diane Lane as Karen Powell
 Brian Kerwin as Brian Powell
 Jennifer Lopez as Miss Marquez
 Bill Cosby as Lawrence Woodruff
 Fran Drescher as Dolores Durante
 Adam Zolotin as Louis Durante
 Todd Bosley as Eddie
 Seth Smith as John-John
 Mario Yedidia as George
 Michael McKean as Paulie
 Allan Rich as Dr. Benfante
 Keone Young as Dr. Lin
 Jurnee Smollett as Phoebe
 Allison Whitbeck as Lucy
 Dwight Hicks as High School Principal
 Mark Coppola as Radio Personality (voice)
 Al Nalbandian as Principal McGee

Production
John Travolta was interested in playing the lead role of Jack but due to an "apology" deal with Robin Williams over royalties from Aladdin, Williams was guaranteed the role.

Release
Jack debuted at #1 and grossed roughly $58.6 million on a budget of $45 million.

Reception
Jack received negative reviews. Rotten Tomatoes, a review aggregator, reports that 17% of 35 surveyed critics gave the film a positive review; the average rating is 4.4/10. The critical consensus reads, "Robin Williams' childlike energy is channeled in all the wrong places with Jack, a bizarre tragedy that aims for uplift but sinks deep into queasy schmaltz." Audiences surveyed by CinemaScore gave the film a grade of "B+" on a scale of A+ to F. Todd McCarthy of Variety called it a "tedious, uneventful fantasy" that wastes the talents of the filmmakers.

Jack was nominated for Worst Picture at the 1996 Stinkers Bad Movie Awards but lost to Striptease.

About the film's reception, Francis Ford Coppola said: "Jack was a movie that everybody hated and I was constantly damned and ridiculed for. I must say I find Jack sweet and amusing. I don't dislike it as much as everyone, but that's obvious—I directed it. I know I should be ashamed of it but I'm not. I don't know why everybody hated it so much. I think it was because of the type of movie it was. It was considered that I had made Apocalypse Now and I'm like a Marty Scorsese type of director, and here I am making this dumb Disney film with Robin Williams. But I was always happy to do any type of film."

Music
The film theme is "Star", performed by Canadian musician Bryan Adams.

References

External links

 
 
 
 

1996 films
1996 comedy-drama films
1990s coming-of-age comedy-drama films
American coming-of-age comedy-drama films
Films about ageing
Films about children
Films scored by Michael Kamen
Films directed by Francis Ford Coppola
Films produced by Francis Ford Coppola
Films set in the San Francisco Bay Area
Films with screenplays by James DeMonaco
Films set in 1986
Films set in 1996
Films set in 2003
Films set in schools
American Zoetrope films
Hollywood Pictures films
1990s English-language films
1990s American films